Jack Cable may refer to:
 Jack Cable (politician)
 Jack Cable (software developer)

See also
 John L. Cable, U.S. Representative from Ohio